The UEFA Euro 2016 qualifying Group I was one of the nine groups to decide which teams would qualify for the UEFA Euro 2016 finals tournament. Group I consisted of five teams: Portugal, Denmark, Serbia, Armenia, and Albania, where they played against each other home-and-away in a round-robin format.

The top two teams, Portugal and Albania, qualified directly for the finals. As third-placed Denmark weren't the highest-ranked among all third-placed teams, they advanced to the play-offs, where they lost to Sweden and thus failed to qualify.

France were also partnered with the five-team Group I, which enabled the 2016 tournament hosts to play centralised friendlies against these countries on their 'spare' dates. However, these friendlies did not count in the qualifying group standings.

Standings

Matches 
The fixtures were released by UEFA the same day as the draw, which was held on 23 February 2014 in Nice. Times are CET/CEST, as listed by UEFA (local times are in parentheses).

Goalscorers

Discipline 
A player was automatically suspended for the next match for the following offences:
 Receiving a red card (red card suspensions could be extended for serious offences)
 Receiving three yellow cards in three different matches, as well as after fifth and any subsequent yellow card (yellow card suspensions were carried forward to the play-offs, but not the finals or any other future international matches)
The following suspensions were served during the qualifying matches:

Portugal coach Fernando Santos was to serve an eight-match touchline ban for unsporting conduct towards the match officials when he was in charge of Greece against Costa Rica in the 2014 FIFA World Cup round of 16 match. The ban was temporarily suspended by the Court of Arbitration for Sport until the final appeal. On 23 March 2015, the CAS ruled that his ban should be reduced to four games, with two suspended during a six-month probationary period, meaning he missed Portugal's matches against Serbia (29 March 2015) and Armenia (13 June 2015).

Notes

References

External links 
https://www.uefa.com/uefaeuro/history/seasons/2016/qualifying/

Group I
2014–15 in Danish football
2015–16 in Danish football
2014–15 in Portuguese football
q
2014–15 in Serbian football
2015–16 in Serbian football
2014–15 in Albanian football
Q
2014–15 in Armenian football
2015–16 in Armenian football